Schloß Pompon Rouge is a 1991 German period erotic comedy television series starring Elisabeth Volkmann. 22 episodes were broadcast on the German private broadcaster RTL Plus from September 1991 to May 1992. The soundtrack to the series was composed by Grzegorz Ciechowski.

Plot
The series is set in Germany in the eighteenth century. The small, insignificant principality of Bommelroth is ruled by Marquis Henri (actually Heinrich) Bommelroth. He and his wife, the Marquise Marie-Antoinette (actually Maria) overindulge themselves in the courtly customs of Versailles.

Cast
Elisabeth Volkmann as Marquise Marie Antoinette de Pompon Rouge
 Jörg Bräuer as Marquis Henri de Pompon Rouge
 Franz H. Hanfstingl as Friedrich von Stolzenfels
 Imo Heite as Abbé
 Stephan Meyer-Kohlhoff as Benno von Stulpnagel
 Katja Bienert as Carmen
Claudine Wilde as Julie
 Kathie Kriegel as Louise

Production and airing
Originally, RTL had planned the production of 52 episodes, but due to financial problems and differences in content, RTL program management and producer Jörn Schröder did not implement this project. 22 episodes were broadcast on the German private broadcaster RTL plus from September 1991 to May 1992. A repeat broadcast aired on Hamburg I urban area television from July to December 1997. The soundtrack to the series was composed by Grzegorz Ciechowski.

Reception
The series has been noted for containing erotic and soft pornographic elements Heiko Kaletta of fernsehserien.de wrote: Schloß Pompon Rouge, in the rococo period. The marquis, owner of the chateau, was inspired by the lifestyle of the court of the French king in Versailles, in keeping with the spirit of the times. Thus, lively parties are celebrated and the castle resembles a single house of pleasure. The Marquis and his sex-hungry wife, the Marquise, spend their money and enjoy the finer things in life. Every now and then, important personalities appear at the castle; for example Casanova or the son of the Russian Tsar ...". Authors Dietrich Schwarzkopf and Walter Hömberg remarked in their book: "How sad it is that the RTL plus series Schloß Pompon - Rouge, as it was read, went erotically in the pants". Daniela Holzer in her 1999 book Die deutsche Sitcom: Format, Konzeption, Drehbuch, Umsetzung described the supporting actors of the series, both male and female, as "libidinous". She sarcastically commented that they were supposed to be "funny and frivolous".

See also
List of German television series

References

External links
 

Television series set in the 18th century
Erotic television series
RTL (German TV channel) original programming
1991 German television series debuts
1992 German television series endings
German-language television shows